Cauldron Dome is a tuya in the Mount Cayley volcanic field, British Columbia, Canada. Cauldron Dome is made of coarsely plagioclase-orthophyroxene-phyric andesite lava flows and last erupted during the Holocene. It is in the Garibaldi Volcanic Belt, a portion of the Canadian Cascade Arc.

See also
List of volcanoes in Canada
Volcanism of Canada
Volcanism of Western Canada

References

Volcanoes of British Columbia
Tuyas of Canada
Mountains of British Columbia
Pleistocene volcanoes
Holocene volcanoes
Polygenetic volcanoes
Mount Cayley volcanic field